Arthur Hart may refer to:
 Arthur Hart (footballer, born 1905) (1905–1989), Australian rules footballer for St Kilda
 Arthur Hart (footballer, born 1917) (1917–1981), Australian rules footballer for Fitzroy
 Arthur Hart-Synnot (1870–1942), British Army general
 "Arthur Hart", fictional character in the American TV series WandaVision